Gąski Lighthouse (Polish: Latarnia morska Gąski) is a lighthouse located in Gąski, on the Polish coast of the Baltic Sea. The lighthouse is located in Gąski, West Pomeranian Voivodeship, in Poland.

History 
The lighthouse is located about 100 metres from the coast of the Baltic Sea; situated next to the road between Ustronie Morskie and Mielno. The construction of the lighthouse began in 1876 and was completed about two years later, in 1878. Built from red bricks, the lighthouse has a height of 41.2 metres, with the lighthouse's light having a focal height of 50.1 metres.

Originally it was fitted with a Fresnel lens with the light source provided by kerosene lamps. The intermittent beam was achieved by three screens rotated by a clock-work mechanism. In 1927 the kerosene lamps were replaced by electric lamp. In 1948, after the Second World War, the lighthouse was reactivated and the clock mechanism was replaced by an electric motor, with the rotation frequency changed from 12 to 15 seconds. The current range of the lighthouse's light glare is about 43.5 kilometres.

The lighthouse is open to the public, allowing tourists to access its top view point. From here there are panoramic views of the Baltic Sea, where one can see the nearby settlements of Sarbinowo, Chłopy, Mielno, and Unieście, all of which are nearby resort towns and villages. At the base of the tower there is the lighthouse keeper's living quarters.

Technical data 
 Light characteristic
 Darkness: 1.2 s.
 Light: 2.5 s.
 Darkness: 1.2 s.
 Light: 2.5 s
 Darkness: 1.2 s.
 Light: 6.4 s.
 Period: 15 s.

See also 

 List of lighthouses in Poland

References

External links 
 Urząd Morski w Słupsku  
 Latarnia morska (Gąski) na portalu polska-org.pl

Lighthouses completed in 1878
Resort architecture in Pomerania
Lighthouses in Poland
Tourist attractions in West Pomeranian Voivodeship
Koszalin County
Brick buildings and structures